Shawn Reilly may refer to:

Shawn Reilly, editor of the Chilton Times-Journal
Shawn Reilly (baseball) of the Rockland Boulders

See also
Sean Reilly (disambiguation)
Sean Riley (disambiguation)